The men's 50 metre pistol competition at the 2015 European Games in Baku, Azerbaijan was held on 16 June at the Baku Shooting Centre.

Schedule
All times are local (UTC+5).

Records

Results

Qualification

Final

References

External links

Men's 50 metre pistol